Olena Reutova (born 18 August 1968) is a Ukrainian rower. She competed in the women's double sculls event at the 1996 Summer Olympics.

References

1968 births
Living people
Ukrainian female rowers
Olympic rowers of Ukraine
Rowers at the 1996 Summer Olympics
Place of birth missing (living people)
20th-century Ukrainian women